Isabella Paige Yoseski (born 30 October 2001), known professionally as Bella Paige, is an Australian singer. She first began her career after reaching the finals on the 2014 edition of The Voice Kids Australia. She later represented Australia in the Junior Eurovision Song Contest 2015, placing eighth.

In 2018, Paige placed second on season seven of The Voice Australia.

Life and career

Karaoke contest
At the age of 9, she won a kid's karaoke contest hosted by Mornings, an Australian TV morning show, and judged by David Campbell and Ian "Dicko" Dickson. She walked away with tickets to see Delta Goodrem live in concert.

The Voice Kids
In 2014, she was a contestant on The Voice Kids. All coaches turned, but she chose Team Madden. She managed to make it to the grand final, where she was a runner-up.

Junior Eurovision
Paige was chosen as Australia's representative for Junior Eurovision Song Contest 2015, performing the song "My Girls", which was originally written by Delta Goodrem for her fifth studio album, but offered up as the winner's song for The Voice 2014 winner Anja Nissen, however it was later turned down by her mentor will.i.am.

The Voice Australia
In 2018, Paige took part in the seventh season of The Voice auditions with the song "Praying". She became a member of coach Kelly Rowland's team. On 17 June 2018, Paige was announced as the runner-up behind the winner Sam Perry who was also from team Kelly Rowland. Paige released her single "Changing" with Universal Music Australia immediately after the final. 

 denotes a song that reached the top 10 on iTunes.

Discography

Singles

Guest appearances

References

2001 births
Living people
Australian pop singers
21st-century Australian singers
Australian people of Macedonian descent
Singers from Melbourne
Junior Eurovision Song Contest entrants
The Voice (Australian TV series) contestants